Planing may refer to:

 Planing (boat) or hydroplaning, a method by which a hull skims over the surface of the water
 Hydroplaning (tires), a loss of traction caused by a layer of water between the tires and the road surface
 Using a plane (tool) to smooth a flat surface of a piece of wood
 Operating a Planer (metalworking) to produce a flat surface
 Harmonic planing (music), chords that move in parallel motion, thereby eliminating any feeling of harmonic progression
 Scaling and root planing, the removal of dental plaque
 Planing (shaping), material removal process

See also
 Planning
 Plane (disambiguation)